Metropolitan state could mean:

 Metropole 
 Metropolitan State University in Minnesota
 Metropolitan State University of Denver in Colorado